Gundur  is a village in the southern state of Karnataka, India. It is located in the Gangawati taluk of Koppal district in Karnataka.

Demographics
As of 2001 India census, Gundur had a population of 6273 with 3166 males and 3107 females.

See also
 Bidar
 Districts of Karnataka

References

External links
 http://Koppal.nic.in/

Villages in Koppal district